Cora Frances Stoddard (September 17, 1872May 13, 1936) was an American temperance activist.

Stoddard was born on September 17, 1872, in Irvington, Nebraska, to Julia F. (Miller) and Emerson H. Stoddard. She received an AB from Wellesley College in 1896. After graduating, she worked as a teacher in Middletown, Connecticut.

Stoddard represented the United States at the 12th International Conference on Alcoholism in London. As of 1914, she was the secretary of the Scientific Temperance Foundation, a successor organization to the Department of Scientific Temperance Instruction of the Woman's Christian Temperance Union. Stoddard had worked as a secretary to Mary Hunt when she headed the department.

She died on May 13, 1936, in Oxford, Connecticut.

References 

1872 births
1937 deaths
19th-century American women
20th-century American women
American temperance activists
Wellesley College alumni
People from Omaha, Nebraska